During the territorial evolution of Russia, the 3rd Guard Infantry division in the Russian Empire consisted of four regiments: the Litovsky Guards Regiment (Leib-Gvardii Litovskii Polk), Kexholm Guards Regiment (Leib-Gvardii Keksgol'mskii Polk), St. Petersburg Guards Regiment (Leib-Gvardii Petersburgskii Polk), and the Volhynian Guard Regiment (Leib-Gvardii Volynskii Polk).

Commanders
1837–1841: Alexei Arbuzov
1841–1846: Alexander von Moller
1846: Vasily Ovander
1877–1887: Victor Deziderjevich Dandevill
1898–1901: Konstantin Alexandrovich Weiss
1901–1904: Alexander Meller-Zakomelsky
1908–1910: Yakov Schkinsky
1916–1917: Alexander K. Bukovsky

Chiefs of Staff
1863–1866: Vasilij Ivanovitch Janovskij

Commanders of the 1st Brigade
1891–1895: Konstantin Alexandrovich Weiss

Commanders of the 2nd Brigade
1909–1910: Alexander Alexeyevich Resin

Commanders of the Artillery Brigade
1833–1835: von Korff
1869–1877: Yakov Ovander

Russian Imperial Guard
Infantry divisions of the Russian Empire